Jovan (Macedonian: Јован) is a Serbian male given name equivalent to English "John" or Slavic "Ivan", from .

Notable people with this name

A
Jovan Aćimović (born 1948), Serbian footballer
Jovan Adepo (born 1988), British-born American actor
Jovan Ajduković (born 1968), Serbian linguist and writer
Jovan Albanez ( 17th-century –  1732), Hapsburg Montenegrin-Serbian military leader
Jovan Ali (born 1995), Trinidadian cricketer
Jovan Anđelković (1942–1969), Serbian footballer
Jovan Andrevski ( 2000–2001), Macedonian military leader
Jovan Asen ( John Komnenos Asen;   1345–1363; died 1363), Bulgarian noble-born Serbian despot
Jovan Atanacković (1848–1921), Serbian general
Jovan Avakumović (1841–1928), Serbian lawyer, criminologist, statesman, and prime minister
Jovan Avakumović (poet) (1748–1810), Hapsburg Serbian noble, poet, and lawyer

B
Jovan Babunski ( Jovan Stojković; 1878–1920), Serbian Chetnik commander
Jovan Baošić (born 1995), Montenegrin footballer
Jovan Beader (born 1970), Serbian basketball coach
Jovan Belcher (1987–2012), American football player
Jovan Beleslin (born 1919), Hungarian-born Serbian footballer, manager, and referee
Jovan Belimarković (1827–1906), Serbian regent and general
Jovan Berislavić ( Ivaniš Berislavić;  1504–1514), Serbian despot
Jovan Bijelić ( 1885 – 1964), Serbian painter
Jovan Blagojevic (disambiguation), several people
Jovan Bowles (born 1983), South African rugby union footballer
Jovan Bridges (stage named Yvie Oddly; born 1993), American drag queen, performer, fashion designer, rapper, and recording artist
Jovan Branković ( 1465 – 1502), Serbian titular despot, monarch, and saint
Jovan Brkljač (born 1993), Serbian footballer
Jovan Byford (born ?), Serbian social psychologist and conspiracy theory expert

C
Jovan Čađenović (born 1995), Montenegrin footballer
Jovan Campbell (stage named Jibbs; born 1990), American rapper
Jovan Ćirilov (1931–2013), Serbian theatrologist, theatre selector, philosopher, writer, and poet
Jovan Ćirković (1871–1928), Serbian teacher, Chetnik revolutionary, military leader, and politician
Jovan Cokić (1927–2004), Serbian footballer
Jovan Čokor (1885–1936), Serbian epidemiologist, infectologist, and physician
Jovan Crnić (born 1994), Serbian basketball player
Jovan Ćulibrk (born 1965), Serbian Orthodox Christian prelate and bishop, and music critic
Jovan Cvetković [see: Jovan Dolgač (below)]
Jovan Cvijić (1865–1927), Serbian geographer, ethnologist, sociologist, and geologist

D
Jovan Damjanic ( János Damjanich; 1804–1849), Austro-Hungarian Serbian Revolutionary Army commander
Jovan Damjanović (born 1982), Serbian footballer and manager
Jovan Dejanović (politician) (1927–2019), Serbian politician
Jovan Deretić (disambiguation), several people
Jovan Deroko (1912–1941), Serbian military commander
Jovan Despotović (born 1962), Serbian art historian, critic, and writer
Jovan Dimitrijević Dobrača (1765–1839), Serbian merchant, and revolutionary military financier and commander
Jovan Divjak (1937–2021), Bosnian army general and writer
Jovan Djaja (1846–1928), Serbian professor, journalist, translator, and politician
Jovan Djordjević (born 1985), Serbian futsal player
Jovan Đokić (born 1992), Serbian footballer
Jovan Dolgač ( Jovan Cvetković; 1860–1915), Macedonian-Serbian Chetnik commander, revolutionary, and weapons smuggler
Jovan Đorđević (1826–1900), Serbian writer, dramatist, education minister, theater founder, and national anthem writer
Jovan Došenović (1781–1813), Serbian philosopher, poet, and translator
Jovan Dovezenski ( Jovan Stanojković; 1873–1935), Serbian teacher and Chetnik commander
Jovan Dragaš (1343–1378), Serbian noble and despot
Jovan Dragoslav ( 1290–1315), Serbian noble and royal tax and treasury official
Jovan Dučić (1871–1943), Herzegovinian-Serbian poet, writer, lyricist, diplomat, and politician
Jovan Džiknić (born 1989), Serbian footballer

E
Jovan Erdeljanović (1874–1944), Serbian and Yugoslav ethnologist

G
Jovan Gavrilović (1796–1877), Serbian historian, politician, statesman, diplomat, prince's deputy, and people's benefactor
Jovan Georgijević ( 1710  –1773), Serbian Orthodox Christian metropolitan
Jovan Gligorijević ( Zeka Buljubaša;  1785 – 1813), Serbian noble and revolutionary captain
Jovan Gojković (1975–2001), Serbian footballer
Jovan Golić (born 1986), Bosnian footballer
Jovan Grčić Milenko (1846–1875), Austro-Hungarian Serbian poet, writer, translator, and physician
Jovan Grković-Gapon (1879–1912), Kosovar-Serbian Orthodox Christian monk and Chetnik

H
Jovan Hadži (1884–1972), Austro-Hungarian Romanian-born Serbian-Slovenian zoologist and taxonomist
Jovan Hadži-Vasiljević (1866–1948), Serbian historian, ethnographer, writer, journalist, and editor
Jovan Hadžić (1799–1869), Hapsburg Serbian writer, legislator, translator, and institute founder
Jovan Hajduković (1943–2013), Hungarian-born Montenegrin footballer
Jovan Haye (born 1982), Jamaican-born American football player
Jovan Horvat (1722–1786), Hapsburg Serbian-born Russian general and territorial founder

I
Jovan Ilić (1824–1901), Serbian poet and politician
Jovan Isailović ( 1772–1804), Serbian icon painter and muralist; grandfather of Jovan Isailović, Jr.
Jovan Isailović, Jr. (1803–1885), Serbian academic painter; grandson of Jovan Isailović

J
Jovan Jančić-Sarajlija [see: Jančić's rebellion] (died 1809), Serbian gunsmith, smuggler, and peasant revolt leader
Jovan Janićijević Burduš (1932–1992), Serbian actor
Jovan Jelovac (born ?), Serbian brand consultant and entrepreneur
Jovan Jezerkić (1920–2000), Serbian footballer
Jovan Jovanov (born 1981), Yugoslavian-born Canadian music producer, record engineer, and singer-songwriter
Jovan Jovanović (disambiguation), several people
Jovan Jugović (1886–1926), Serbian aviator and fighter pilot

K
Jovan Kantul ( Jovan II;  1592–1614), Serbian archbishop and patriarch
Jovan Kapičić ( Jovo Kapičić; 1919–2013), Yugoslavian general and politician
Jovan Karamata (1902–1967), Serbian mathematician, professor, and school founder
Jovan Karlo Villalba (born 1977), American artist
Jovan Kastratović (born 1993), Serbian footballer
Jovan II Kastriot ( Gjon Kastrioti II; 1456–1501), Albanian count and national liberation hero
Jovan Kavarić (born 1934), Montenegrin clinical biochemist, professor, and politician
Jovan Kirovski (born 1976), American soccer player, Olympics competitor, and coach
Jovan Kokir (born 2000), Serbian footballer
Jovan Kolundžija (born 1948), Serbian violin maestro and politician
Jovan Koprivica (born 1982), Serbian basketball player
Jovan Koseski (pen name of Janez Vesel; 1798–1884), Slovenian lawyer and poet
Jovan Kostovski (born 1987), Macedonian footballer
Jovan Kosturi (1831–1924), Albanian politician and Tosk Albanian dialect education advocate
Jovan Kratohvil (1924–1998), Yugoslavian sports shooter and Olympics competitor
Jovan Krkobabić (1930–2014), Serbian politician
Jovan Krneta (born 1992), Serbian footballer
Jovan Kursula ( Jovan Petrović; 1768–1813), Serbian military commander, swordfighter, and revolutionary

L
Jovan Lazarević (born 1952), Yugoslavian shot putter
Jovan Lučić (born 1987), Canadian and Serbian footballer
Jovan Lukić (footballer, born 1997) (born 1997), Serbian footballer
Jovan Lukić (footballer, born 2002), Serbian footballer

M
Jovan Maksimović ( John of Shanghai and San Francisco; 1896–1966), Russian Orthodox Christian bishop and saint
Jovan Maleševac ( 1524–1562), Serbian Orthodox Christian monk and scribe
Jovan Mandil (1873–1916), Serbian Jewish lawyer, journalist, newspaper editor, and publicist
Jovan Marić (born 1941), Serbian psychiatrist, author, sexologist, and professor
Jovan Marinković (born 1996), Serbian footballer
Jovan Marinović (1821–1893), Serbian politician and diplomat
Jovan Markoski (born 1980), Serbian footballer
Jovan Marković (born 2001), Romanian footballer
Jovan Markovski (born 1988), Macedonian basketball player
Jovan Markuš (born 1949), Montenegrin politician, journalist, publicist, historian, and heraldist
Jovan Melton (born ?), American politician and consultant
Jovan Mijušković (1886–1944), Serbian doctor and Nazi politician
Jovan Mikić Spartak (1914–1944), Yugoslavian track and field athlete, Olympics competitor, and anti-fascist
Jovan Miladinović (born 1982), Serbian footballer
Jovan Mišković (1844–1908), Serbian general, war minister, military theorist, and writer 
Jovan Monasterlija ( 1683–1706), Austrian-Serbian duke, general, and militia commander
Jovan Muškatirović (1743–1809), Hapsburg Serbian author, lawyer, and educator

N
Jovan Najdanović (born 1997), Serbian footballer
Jovan Naumović (1879–1945), Yugoslavian Serbian army general
Jovan Nenad ( 1492 – 1527), Serbian noble and rebel monarch
Jovan Nikolić (disambiguation), several people
Jovan Ninković (born 1987), Serbian footballer
Jovan Nišić (born 1998), Serbian footballer
Jovan Novak (born 1994), Serbian basketball player

O
Jovan Obrenović (1787–1850), Serbian general
Jovan Olafioye (born 1987), US-born Canadian football player
Jovan Oliver ( 1310 –  1356), Serbian noble, general, despot, knight, and judge
Jovan Ovčarević ( 1557), Hapsburg Serbian noble

P
Jovan Pačić (1771–1849), Serbian soldier, poet, writer, philologist, translator, illustrator, and painter
Jovan Paču (1847–1942), Serbian composer, concert pianist, and physician
Jovan Pajković (born 1946), Serbian boxer and Olympics competitor
Jovan Palalić (born 1971), Serbian politician
Jovan Pavlović (1936–2014), Serbian-Croatian Orthodox Christian metropolitan
Jovan Pavlović (minister) (1843–1892), Serbian newspaper publisher and education minister
Jovan Pešić (1866–1936), Serbian war painter and photographer, sculpture, and Chetnik soldier
Jovan Petrović [see: Jovan Kursula (above)]
Jovan Plamenac (1873–1944), Montenegrin and Yugoslavian politician, and Nazi collaborator
Jovan Popović (disambiguation), several people
Jovan Prokopljević (born 1940), Serbian architect, cartoonist, and caricaturist

R
Jovan Radivojević (born 1982), Serbian footballer
Jovan Radomir (born 1963), Bosnian Yugoslavian-born Swedish television presenter, actor, author, and lyricist
Jovan Radonić (1873–1956), Austro-Hungarian-born Yugoslavian-Serbian historian and librarian
Jovan Radonjić (1748–1803), Montenegrin noble and politician
Jovan Radulović (1951–2018), Serbian writer, publicist, and library administrator
Jovan Rajić (1726–1801), Hapsburg Serbian writer, historian, theologian, traveller, geographer, and pedagogue
Jovan Rašković (1929–1992), Serbian-Croatian psychiatrist, academic, and politician
Jovan Rebula (born 1997), South African golfer
Jovan Ristić (1831–1899), Serbian politician, diplomat, and historian
Jovan Ružić (1898–1973), Serbian Yugoslavian footballer

S
Jovan Šajnović (1924–2004), Serbian conductor, professor, and classical pianist
Jovan Santos-Knox (born 1994), US-born Canadian football player
Jovan Šarčević (1966–2015), Serbian footballer
Jovan Savić (1772–1813), Serbian professor, bishop, diplomat, and politician
Jovan Šević (died  1764), Hapsburg and Russian Serbian general
Jovan Simić Bobovac (1775–1832), Serbian politician, military commander, and revolutionary
Jovan Skerlić (1877–1914), Serbian writer and literary critic
Jovan Smith [see: J. Stalin] (born 1983), American songwriter, musician, and rapper
Jovan Soldatović (1920–2005), Serbian sculptor
Jovan Spasić (1909–1981), Yugoslavian footballer
Jovan Stanković (born 1971), Serbian footballer
Jovan Stanojković [see: Jovan Dovezenski (above)]
Jovan Stefanović (born 1984), Serbian footballer
Jovan Stejić (1803–1853), Hapsburg Serbian physician, writer, philologist, and policy critic
Jovan Sterija Popović (1806–1856), Serbian playwright, poet, lawyer, philosopher, and pedagogue
Jovan Stojanović (born 1992), Serbian footballer
Jovan Stojković [see: Jovan Babunski (above)]
Jovan Stojoski (born 1997), Serbian-Macedonian sprinter
Jovan Subotić (1817–1886), Serbian lawyer, writer, politician and academic
Jovan Sundečić (1825–1900), Montenegrin Orthodox Christian priest, royal secretary, poet, and national anthem writer

T
Jovan Talevski (born 1984), Macedonian handball player
Jovan Talovac ( 1440–1461), Serbian-Hungarian noble
Jovan Tanasijević (born 1998), Montenegrin footballer
Jovan Tekelija ( 1660 –  1721–22), Hapsburg-Serbian noble and military leader
Jovan the Serb (disambiguation), several people
Jovan Tomić (1869–1932), Serbian historian and academic
Jovan Tošković (1893–1943), Montenegrin Serbian historian, professor and politician
Jovan Trifunovski (1914–1997), Serbian geographer and anthropologist
Jovan Trnić (born 1996), Serbian footballer

U
Jovan Uglješa ( Uglješa Mrnjavčević;  1346–1371), Serbian noble, despot, and soldier
Jovan Uroš ( John Uroš;   1370 –  1373; died 1422–23), Serbian despot of Thessaly

V
Jovan Valenta (1826–1887), Serbian physician, surgeon, hospital manager, and politician
Jovan Vasić (born 1987), Serbian footballer
Jovan Vavic (born 1961/62), Yugoslavian-born American water polo coach
Jovan Veselinov (1906–1982), Serbian prime minister
Jovan Vićić (born 1997), Serbian footballer
Jovan Vidović (born 1989), Slovenian footballer
Jovan Vlalukin (born 1999), Serbian footballer
Jovan Vladimir ( 990 – 1016), Serbian monarch and saint
Jovan Vraniškovski (born 1961), Serbian-Macedonian imprisoned Orthodox Christian archbishop
Jovan Vojinović (born 1998), Montenegrin basketball player
Jovan Vučinić (born 1992), Montenegrin footballer

Z
Jovan Zdravevski (born 1980), Macedonian-born Icelandic basketball player
Jovan Zivlak (born 1947), Serbian poet, publisher, and essayist
Jovan Zonjić (1907–1961), Serbian painter
Jovan Zucović (born 1990), Serbian footballer
Jovan Žujović (1856–1936), Serbian anthropologist, geologist, paleontologist, and craniometrist

Fictional characters
Jovan Myovic in the American TV series 24

See also
Jovan (disambiguation)
Jovanka (disambiguation)
Joven (disambiguation)
Javon (disambiguation)
Protopop Jovan (disambiguation)
Ricky Jovan Gray (1977–2017), American murderer

Macedonian masculine given names
Serbian masculine given names